Jithani is a Pakistani family television soap opera first aired on 6 February 2016 on Hum TV. It is produced by Momina Duraid in the MD Productions and directed by Haseeb Ali. It aired every Monday to Friday 7.30 pm PST.

Cast
Komal Aziz Khan as Haniya
Farah Shah as Sheyla
Erum Akhtar as Raheela
Farhan Ali Agha
Shazeen Rahat
Yasir Shoro
Saima Qureshi as Iffat
Madiha Rizvi
Hassan Noman

See also 
 List of programs broadcast by Hum TV

References

External links 
 Hum TV official website

Pakistani television soap operas
Pakistani drama television series
2017 Pakistani television series debuts
2017 Pakistani television series endings
Urdu-language television shows
Hum TV original programming